The World Rally Championship (WRC) is a rallying series organised by the FIA, culminating with a champion driver and manufacturer. The driver's world championship and manufacturer's world championship are separate championships, but based on the same point system. The series currently consists of 13 three-day events driven on surfaces ranging from gravel and tarmac to snow and ice. Each rally is split into 10–25 special stages which are run against the clock on closed roads.

Sébastien Loeb holds the record for the most event victories, having won 80 times. Sébastien Ogier is second with 57 wins and Marcus Grönholm is third with 30 wins. Sébastien Loeb holds the distinction of having the longest time between his first win and his last. Shekhar Mehta and Jean-Luc Thérier share the record for the longest period of time between two wins–almost six years between the 1973 Safari Rally and the 1979 Safari Rally for the Kenyan driver and 1974 Press-on-Regardless Rally and 1980 Tour de Corse for the French driver. Loeb holds the record for the most consecutive wins, having two six-win streaks (2005 Rally New Zealand–2005 Rally Argentina and 2008 Wales Rally GB–2009 Rally Argentina). Kalle Rovanperä is the youngest winner of a World Rally Championship event; he was 20 years, 11 months and 17 days old when he won the 2021 Rally Estonia. Loeb is the oldest winner of a World Rally Championship event; he was 47 years and 331 days old when he won the 2022 Monte Carlo Rally. Latvala holds the record for the most event wins (18) without ever winning a championship.

As of the 2023 Rally Mexico, there have been 80 different World Rally Championship event winners. The first rally winner was Jean-Claude Andruet at the 1973 Rally Monte Carlo, and the most recent driver to score their first win was Kalle Rovanperä at the 2021 Rally Estonia.

By driver

All figures correct as of the 2023 Rally Mexico. In total of 631 WRC events.

By driver's nationality
All figures correct as of the 2023 Rally Mexico.

Milestone races winners

Most wins per season
All figures correct as of the 2023 Rally Mexico. In total of 631 WRC events. 

* Season still in progress.

By co-driver
The WRC events have been won by 102 different co-drivers. All figures correct as of the 2023 Rally Mexico.

By constructor
21 different constructors have won a rally as of the 2023 Rally Mexico.

See also
 List of World Rally Championship records

References

External links
 WRC.com — official site
 World Rally Championship regulations fia.com

World Rally Championship event winners
Event winners